The 1995 Asia Cup (also known as the Pepsi Asia Cup), was the fifth Asia Cup tournament, and the second to be held in Sharjah, UAE. The tournament took place between April 5–14, 1995. Four teams took part in the tournament: India, Pakistan, Sri Lanka and Bangladesh.

The 1995 Asia Cup was a round-robin tournament where each team played the other once, and the top two teams qualifying for a place in the final. India, Pakistan and Sri Lanka all had four points at the end of the round-robin stage, but India and Sri Lanka qualified for the final on the basis of better run-rates. India beat Sri Lanka by 8 wickets to win its third consecutive (and fourth in total) Asia Cup.

Squads

Matches

Group stage

Final

Statistics

Most runs

Most wickets

See also
 Asia Cup

References

 Cricket Archive: Pepsi Asia Cup 1994/95 http://www.cricketarchive.co.uk/Archive/Seasons/UAE/1994-95_UAE_Pepsi_Asia_Cup_1994-95.html
 CricInfo: Asia Cup, 1995 http://usa.cricinfo.com/db/ARCHIVE/1994-95/OD_TOURNEYS/ASIA/

External links
 Cricinfo tournament page

Asia Cup
Asia Cup, 1995
Asia
International cricket competitions from 1994–95 to 1997
International cricket competitions in the United Arab Emirates
Cricket in the United Arab Emirates
Asia Cup